Taipivai is a town on Nuku Hiva island.

References

Populated places in the Marquesas Islands
Nuku Hiva